Live...For the Record is a live album by American punk band Fear, released in 1991.

Track listing
Null Detector - 1:17 
I Love Livin' in the City - 1:58 
New York's Alright If You Like Saxophones- 1:59 
Beef Bologna - 2:31 
More Beer - 3:00 
What Are Friends For? - 2:19 
Welcome to the Dust Ward - 2:35 
I Am a Doctor - 2:20 
We Gotta Get Out of This Place - 2:51 
Fuck Christmas - 1:24 
Responsibility - 2:24 
Hey - 2:01 
Waiting for the Meat - :49 
Camarillo - 1:16 
Foreign Policy - 4:48 
Give Me Some Action - :53 
We Destroy the Family - 1:25 
I Don't Care About You - 1:59 
Let's Have a War - 2:43

Personnel
Lee Ving: vocals, guitar, harmonica
Philo Cramer: guitar, vocals
Lorenzo Buhne: bass
Spit Stix: drums

References

Fear (band) albums
1991 live albums
Caroline Records live albums